South Prairie is a town in Pierce County, Washington, United States. The population was 373 at the 2020 census.

History
South Prairie was platted in 1888 by Frank Bisson.  It was named because of its location, south of Connell's and Porter's prairies. In 1885 its name was changed to "Cascade Junction," but residents resisted the change and it was officially incorporated as "South Prairie" on February 17, 1909.

Geography
South Prairie is located at  (47.138402, -122.096848).

Demographics

2010 census
As of the census of 2010, there were 434 people, 166 households, and 115 families living in the town. The racial makeup of the town was 92.4% White, 0.5% African American, 2.5% Native American, 0.7% Asian, 0.5% from other races, and 3.5% from two or more races. Hispanic or Latino of any race were 1.2% of the population.

There were 166 households, of which 36.1% had children under the age of 18 living with them, 56.6% were married couples living together, 7.8% had a female householder with no husband present, 4.8% had a male householder with no wife present, and 30.7% were non-families. 24.7% of all households were made up of individuals, and 8.4% had someone living alone who was 65 years of age or older. The average household size was 2.61 and the average family size was 3.15.

The median age in the town was 40.6 years. 25.8% of residents were under the age of 18; 6.7% were between the ages of 18 and 24; 22.5% were from 25 to 44; 33.8% were from 45 to 64; and 11.1% were 65 years of age or older. The gender makeup of the town was 51.8% male and 48.2% female.

2000 census
As of the census of 2000, there were 382 people, 125 households, and 98 families living in the town. The population density was 938.3 people per square mile (359.7/km2). There were 138 housing units at an average density of 339.0 per square mile (130.0/km2). The racial makeup of the town was 93.98% White, 1.05% African American, 2.09% Native American, 1.31% Asian, and 1.57% from two or more races. Hispanic or Latino of any race were 0.79% of the population.

There were 125 households, out of which 44.8% had children under the age of 18 living with them, 68.0% were married couples living together, 4.8% had a female householder with no husband present, and 20.8% were non-families. 12.0% of all households were made up of individuals, and 3.2% had someone living alone who was 65 years of age or older. The average household size was 3.06 and the average family size was 3.40.

In the town, the age distribution of the population shows 33.0% under the age of 18, 4.7% from 18 to 24, 38.5% from 25 to 44, 16.8% from 45 to 64, and 7.1% who were 65 years of age or older. The median age was 32 years. For every 100 females, there were 108.7 males. For every 100 females age 18 and over, there were 100.0 males.

The median income for a household in the town was $50,250, and the median income for a family was $56,250. Males had a median income of $47,589 versus $37,250 for females. The per capita income for the town was $19,345. About 1.8% of families and 5.1% of the population were below the poverty line, including 4.5% of those under age 18 and 13.0% of those age 65 or over.

References

External links
 The Gazette, Local Newspaper
 Town Web Site

Towns in Pierce County, Washington
Towns in Washington (state)
1909 establishments in Washington (state)